Codium mamillosum is a species of seaweed in the Codiaceae family.

The medium green globose thallus has a diameter of around  that is attached to a tuft of rhizoids.

It is found from low tidal areas to a depth of  sublittoral zone in moderate water coasts.

In Western Australia is found along the coast in the Mid West region extending along the south coast and along the east coast of Victoria. The species is also found around Hawaii and Japan.

References

mamillosum
Plants described in 1855